Konstantin Alexeyevich Bezmaternikh (born 22 March 1988) is a Russian pair skater. With former partner Ksenia Krasilnikova, he is the 2008 World Junior champion.

Career 
Bezmaternikh teamed up with Ksenia Krasilnikova in 2003. The pair was coached by Valeri Tiukov and Valentina Tiukova in poor conditions in Perm. Although they placed second on the day, they were later awarded the 2007-08 Junior Grand Prix Final title following the retroactive disqualification of Vera Bazarova / Yuri Larionov due to a positive doping sample from Larionov. 

Krasilnikova/Bezmaternikh withdrew from the 2009 Nebelhorn Trophy after the short program – he injured ligaments in his right hand. Krasilnikova decided to retire from competitive skating after the 2009–10 season due to a persistent back injury.

Bezmaternikh moved to Saint Petersburg and began training in Tamara Moskvina and Artur Dmitriev's group. In 2010, he teamed up with Sabina Imaikina and finished 10th at the 2011 Russian Nationals. In February 2011, they announced their split. Moskvina paired him with Oksana Nagalaty later that month. Nagalaty and Bezmaternikh parted ways at the end of the 2011–12 season. He then skated with Ekaterina Petaikina for one season.

Programs

With Nagalaty

With Krasilnikova

Competitive highlights

With Petaikina

With Nagalatiy

With Imaikina

With Krasilnikova

References

External links 

 
 

Russian male pair skaters
1988 births
Living people
Sportspeople from Perm, Russia
World Junior Figure Skating Championships medalists
Competitors at the 2009 Winter Universiade
Competitors at the 2011 Winter Universiade